This is a list of governors of the Austrian state of Lower Austria:

Before 1918

Governors of the Archduchy of Austria under the Enns (1500–1749)
 Wolfgang Freiherr von Polheim (1458–1512) 1501–1512 
 Georg von Rottal zu Thalberg (see Rottal) (?–1525) 1513–1521; also President of the Lower Austrian Chamber (1523–1525)
 Pietro Bonomo, Bischof von Triest (d. i. Giovanni Antonio Bonomo; 1458–1546) 1521–1523 
 Sigismund Freiherr von Dietrichstein (1484–1533) 1523–1524 
 Leonhard von Harrach zu Rohrau (1481–1527) 1524–1525 
 Cyriak Freiherr von Polheim und Wartenburg (1495–1533) 1526–1527 
 Georg Freiherr von Puchheim zu Raabs und Krumbach (?–1531) 1528–1531 
 Christoph von Rauber (from 1533: Fürst) (1466–1536) 1532–1536 
 Trojan von Auersperg (1495–1541) 1537–1541 
 Hans (III.) Ungnad Freiherr von Sonneck (1493–1564) 1542–1544 
 Christoph von Eyczing (1501–1563) 1544–1551, außerdem 1542 bis 1544 Landmarschall der Niederösterreichischen Landstände
 Gabriel Ritter von Kreuzer (?–1565) 1552–1564 
 Joachim Freiherr von Schönkirchen (1517–1572) 1565–1572, außerdem 1560 bis 1563 Landmarschall der Niederösterreichischen Landstände
 Oswald Philipp von Eyczing (1512–1587) 1572–1587 
 Seifried Freiherr von Breuner (1538–1594) 1587–1591 
 Ruprecht Freiherr von Stotzingen (c. 1542–1600) 22 June 1592 – 1600 
 Wolfgang Freiherr von Hofkirchen (1555–1611) 1600–1601 
 Ernst Mollard Freiherr von Reinegg und Drosendorf (before 1576–1621) 1601–1608 
 Paul Sixtus Trautson Graf zu Falkenstein (1548–1621) 1608–1621 
 Leonhard Helfried Graf von Meggau, Freiherr von Creuzen (1577–1644) 1621–1626 
 Seifried Christoph Breuner Freiherr von Stübing, Fladnitz und Rabenstein (1569–1651) 1626–1640, also President of the Lower Austrian Chamber (1600–1609) and Land Marshal of the Lower Austrian Estates (1620–1626)
 Georg Freiherr von Teufel auf Gundersdorf, Eckartsau und Esslingen (c. 1580–1642) 1640–1642 
 Johann Franz Trautson Graf zu Falkenstein (1609–1663) 1642–1663, also Land Marshal of the Lower Austrian Estates (1637–1642)
 Konrad Balthasar von Starhemberg (1612–1687, from 1643: Graf) 1663–1687 
 Johann Quintin Freiherr von Jörger (see Jörger von Tollet) (1624–1705, from 1658: Graf) 1687–1705 
 Ferdinand Karl Graf und Herr von Weltz, Freiherr von Ebenstein und Spiegelfeld (1653–1711) 1705–1711 
 Sigismund Friedrich Graf von Khevenhüller (1666–1742, from 1725: Reichsgraf) 1711–1742 
 Leopold Johann Victorin Wilhelm Graf von Windisch-Graetz (1686–1746) 1742–1746 
 Johann Ferdinand Graf von Kuefstein (1686–1755) 1747–1749

Governors of the Archduchy of Austria under the Enns (1749–1809)

 Adam Philipp Losy Graf von Losymthal (?–1781) 1749–1750 
 Philipp Joseph Graf von Orsini-Rosenberg (1691–1765) 1750–1753 
 Heinrich Wilhelm Freiherr von Haugwitz (1711–1758) 1753–1758
 Franz Ferdinand Graf von Schrattenbach (1707–1785) 1759–1770 
 Christian August Graf von Seilern-Aspang (1717–1801) 1770–1779 
 Joseph Johann Nepomuk Graf von Herberstein (1725–1809) 1779–1782
 Johann Anton Graf von Pergen (1725–1814) 1782–1790, also Land Marshal of the Lower Austrian Estates (1775–1790)
 Wenzel Graf Sauer von und zu Ankenstein (1742–1799) 1791–1795 
 Franz Josef Graf von Saurau (1760–1832) 1795–1797, also Land Marshal of the Lower Austrian Estates (1803–1805)
 Jakob Reichsfreiherr von Wöber zu Hagenberg 1797–1802
 Joseph Thaddäus Vogt Freiherr von Sumerau (1749–1817) 1802–1804
 Joseph Karl Graf von Dietrichstein (1763–1825) 1804–1805, also Land Marshal of the Lower Austrian Estates (1811–1825)
 Ignaz Karl Graf von Chorinsky, Freiherr von Ledske (1770–1823) 1805–1807 
 Ferdinand Graf von Bissingen und Nippenburg (1749–1831) 1807–1809

Governors (Statthalter) of the Archduchy of Austria under the Enns (1809–1918)

 Franz Josef Graf von Saurau (1760–1832) 1809–1814, also Land Marshal of the Lower Austrian Estates (1803–1805)
 Ignaz Karl Graf von Chorinsky, Freiherr von Ledske (1770–1823) 1815–1816 
 Augustin Freiherr Reichmann von Hochkirchen (1755–1828, until 1817: Augustin Reichmann) 1817–1828 
 Alois Graf von Ugarte (1784–1845) 1828–1829 
 Franz Graf von Klebelsberg, Freiherr zu Thumburg (1774–1857) 1829–1830 
 Johann Adam Freiherr Talatzko von Gestieticz (1778–1858, until 1834: Johann Adam Talatzko) 1830–1848 
 Anton Raimund Graf von Lamberg (1795–1869) 1848–1848 
 Joseph Wilhelm von Eminger (1801–1858, from 1856: Freiherr von) 1849–1858 
 Karl Johann Joseph Prinz von Lobkowitz (1814–1879) 1858–1860 
 Anton Halbhuber Freiherr von Festwill (1809–1886, from 1854 Freiherr) 1860–1862 
 Gustav Ignaz Graf von Chorinsky, Freiherr von Ledske (1806–1873) 1862–1868 
 Philipp Weber von Ebenhof (1818–1900, from 1853: Ritter, from 1880 Freiherr) 1868–1872 
 Sigmund Conrad von Eybesfeld (1821–1898, from 1854: Edler. from 1870 Freiherr) 1872–1880 
 Ludwig Freiherr Possinger (1823–1899, from 1860: Ritter, from 1870 Freiherr von Choborski) 1880–1889 
 Erich Graf von Kielmansegg (1847–1923) 1889–1895 
 Friedrich Freiherr Bourguignon von Baumberg (1846–1907) 1895–1895 
 Erich Graf von Kielmansegg (1847–1923) 1895–1911 
 Richard Graf von Bienerth-Schmerling (1863–1918, Ritter von, ab 1868: Freiherr, ab 1915: Graf) 1911–1915 
 Oktavian Freiherr Regner von Bleyleben (1866–1945, 1911–1919: Freiherr von Bleyleben, from 1919: Oktavian Regner-Bleyleben) 1915–1918

After 1918

References

Lower Austria
Lower Austria
Governors